Miquel Feliu Badal (born 17 May 1985), commonly known as Miki Feliu, is a former Spanish professional basketball player. At the 2018–19 season start he was the seventh player with more games (447) in the Spanish second tier.

Career

Manresa

Played for the Bàsquet Manresa academy and made his professional debut on 28 September 2002, playing 7 minutes on a Liga ACB game against CB Gran Canaria. He played five more games on the 2002–03 season. Spent the next years playing for the farm teams Olesa and CB L'Hospitalet, and 9 games for Manresa on the 2004–05 season. Member of the first team after the relegation to LEB Oro, was loaned to CB Alcúdia, CB Vic and CB Sant Josep after a two years of contract extension.

LEB Oro

After leaving Manresa, he joined Obradoiro CAB on 2010. The team was promoted to Liga ACB, second achievement for Feliu since 2007 with Manresa. Joined CE Lleida Bàsquet on 2011, the last year of the team on competition, and Força Lleida CE on 2012, spending only one season. He also played for Palencia Baloncesto and CB Tizona, becoming LEB Oro champion for second time. After one season back to Palma, he returned to Força Lleida.

National team

Feliu played for the Spanish men's national team on the 2001 FIBA Europe Under-16 Championship, scoring 27 points in the bronze medal game against Lithuania. Also a member of the team on the 2002 FIBA Europe Under-18 Championship and 2005 FIBA Europe Under-20 Championship.

References

External links
ACB profile 
FEB profile 

1985 births
Living people
Spanish men's basketball players
Liga ACB players
Bàsquet Manresa players
CB L'Hospitalet players
CB Vic players
CB Girona players
Obradoiro CAB players
Palencia Baloncesto players
Força Lleida CE players
Small forwards